F2, F.II or similar may refer to:

Science and mathematics
 F2, the chemical formula for fluorine
  or GF(2), in mathematics, the Galois field of two elements
 F2, a category in the Fujita scale of tornado intensity
 F2 hybrid, a type of crossing in classical genetics
 F2 layer, a stratum of the Earth's ionosphere
 F-2 mycotoxin or zearalenone, a chemical produced by fungi
 NIST-F2, an atomic clock

Medicine
 F2 or Foundation Year 2, part of the UK Foundation Programme for postgraduate medical practitioners
 F-2 (drug), a psychedelic drug
 F2-isoprostane, a compound formed in vivo from fatty acids
 F2 gene, present on human chromosome 11, encodes for thrombin

Films
F2: Fun and Frustration, a 2019 Indian Telugu language film starring Venkatesh and Varun Tej

Technology
 , a function key on a computer keyboard
 F2 or flat twin engine, a type of two-cylinder internal combustion engine
 Anik F2, a Canadian geostationary communications satellite
 Nikon F2, a professional SLR camera

Transportation

Aviation
 Fly Air, IATA designator F2, a Turkish private airline
 Fieseler F2 Tiger, a German single-seat aerobatic biplane
 Flanders F.2, a 1911 British experimental single-seat monoplane aircraft
 Fokker F.II, a 1919 German early airliner
 Metropolitan-Vickers F.2, a 1941 British early turbojet engine

Rail
 EMD F2, a class of GM diesel freight locomotive built in 1946
 H&BR Class F2, a class of 0-6-2T steam locomotives of the Hull and Barnsley Railway
 PRR F2, a classification of Mogul steam locomotive on the Pennsylvania Railroad

Road
 Alta F2, a 1952 British racing car
 DKW F2, a 1930s German small car
 Marussia F2, a Russian large luxury car

Boat 

 F2, the Sydney Ferries' services to Taronga Zoo

Military

Air
 Beechcraft F-2 Expeditor, an American twin engine reconnaissance aircraft
 Blackburn F.2 Lincock, a 1928 British single-seat lightweight fighter
 Bristol F.2 Fighter, a 1916 British two-seat biplane fighter and reconnaissance aircraft
 Dassault Mirage F2, a 1960s French prototype two-seat attack fighter
 Fairey F.2, a 1917 British fighter prototype
 Felixstowe F.2, a 1917 British First World War flying boat
 Hunter F 2, a 1953 Hawker Hunter fighter aircraft variant
 Lübeck-Travemünde F.2, early German reconnaissance floatplane
 McDonnell F-2 Banshee, a carrier-based jet fighter aircraft of the 1950s
 Mitsubishi F-2, a Japanese fighter aircraft, based on the F-16 Fighting Falcon
 RAF Tornado F2, a long-range, twin-engine swing-wing interceptor
 F 2 Hägernäs, a former Swedish Air Force wing

Sea
 , an F class First World War submarine of the Royal Navy
 , a 1910s F-class submarine of the United States Navy
 20 mm modèle F2 gun, a French naval gun

Land
 F2 81mm Mortar, an Australian weapon
 FR F2 sniper rifle, the standard sniper rifle of the French military
 KMW F2, a German modular wheeled armoured vehicle

Other uses
 F2 (classification), a wheelchair sport classification
 F-2 visa, a U.S. visa type for dependents of students
 F2Freestylers, British freestyle football duo also known as The F2
 F2 Logistics, Filipino logistics company
 F2 Logistics Cargo Movers, volleyball team owned by the logistics company of the same name
 Formula Two, a type of open-wheel racing
 F2, the second formant

See also
 2F (disambiguation)
 FII (disambiguation)